David Otto (born 3 March 1999) is a German professional footballer who plays as a forward for 2. Bundesliga club FC St. Pauli.

Career
On 20 May 2019, it was confirmed that Otto would play the 2019–20 season for 1. FC Heidenheim on loan from 1899 Hoffenheim.

On 20 January 2021, Otto signed on loan with SSV Jahn Regensburg until the end of the 2021–22 season.

On 30 June 2022, Otto signed for FC St. Pauli.

Career statistics

References

External links
 
 

1999 births
Living people
Sportspeople from Pforzheim
German footballers
Footballers from Baden-Württemberg
Association football forwards
Germany youth international footballers
TSG 1899 Hoffenheim II players
TSG 1899 Hoffenheim players
1. FC Heidenheim players
SSV Jahn Regensburg players
FC St. Pauli players
Bundesliga players
2. Bundesliga players
Regionalliga players
21st-century German people